Drelincourt is a French surname, and may refer to:
 Charles Drelincourt (1595-1669), a French Protestant
 His sons: 
 Laurent Drelincourt (1626-1681), a French Protestant pastor
 Charles Drelincourt (1633-1697), a French physician
 Peter Drelincourt (1644-1722), Dean of Armagh